Lori Anne Barbero (born November 27, 1961) is an American musician and singer who rose to notoriety as the drummer of the Minneapolis-based punk rock band Babes in Toyland, which she joined in 1987. After the dissolution of Babes in Toyland in 2001, Barbero subsequently played drums for the bands Eggtwist and Koalas. In 2015, she reunited with Babes in Toyland, performing on an international tour with the band.

Early life
Barbero was born in Minneapolis on November 27, 1961. She is of Filipino and Scandinavian descent. At the age of fourteen, her father moved the family to Pearl River, New York, where she attended high school, graduating in 1978.

During her teenage years, Barbero often ventured into New York City to attend concerts, specifically at  CBGB, which exposed her to a wide array of bands: "From where my house was—we lived on a hill—I could see New York. So I went into the city a lot, and I saw a lot of music," Barbero recalled. "I liked music that was probably not as acceptable to a lot of ears as it was to mine. In high school, I loved David Bowie and I loved Queen. I remember going to the city and seeing a lot of punk stuff, [like] the Tubes and Patti Smith, and the New York Dolls. I was pretty lucky because it was just part of my life."

After high school, Barbero moved to Key West, Florida before returning to Minneapolis, where she attended the University of Minnesota before dropping out and working as a waitress.

Career

Barbero had never played a musical instrument prior to joining Babes in Toyland, but had always wanted to learn to play drums. Upon meeting Kat Bjelland at a barbecue in the mid-1980s, Bjelland asked her to start a band with her.

After the dissolution of Babes in Toyland in the early 2000s, Barbero worked as a music manager, and for a time was Courtney Love's assistant during the recording of America's Sweetheart (2004), beginning in 2002. She was subsequently employed by the South by Southwest Music Festival in Austin, Texas as an assistant production manager for a total of seven years, beginning in the late 2000s. She was also part owner of the now defunct Minneapolis label Spanish Fly Records, whose roster included Smut, Dumpster Juice, Milk, REO Speedealer, Sleep Capsule, and Likehell.

Lori contributed to a zine called After Grrrl (Small Stories From Big Lives) in 2015. The zine included stories from many influential female artists, icons, and taste makers including Allison Wolfe, Camille Rose Garcia, Tara McPherson, Kelly Osbourne, Bonnie Burton, Remy Holwick, Jessicka, Janine Jarman as well as many others.

Personal life
As of 2014, Barbero divided her time between Minneapolis and Austin, Texas.

References

Sources

External links

 
 My Space: Koalas
 Sound Unseen

1961 births
Living people
Musicians from Minneapolis
American musicians of Filipino descent
American people of Scandinavian descent
American rock drummers
American women drummers
University of Minnesota alumni
20th-century American drummers
20th-century American women musicians
20th-century American musicians
21st-century American women
Women in punk